A list of films produced in Pakistan in 1976 (see 1976 in film) and in the Urdu language:

1976

See also
1976 in Pakistan

External links
 Search Pakistani film - IMDB.com

1976
Pakistani
Films